Hopfenberg (German, hop hill) may refer to:

Places
 Hopfenberg (Ried), in the borough of Ried im Innkreis, Upper Austria
 Chmielno, West Pomeranian Voivodeship, Poland
 Bad Hopfenberg, a spa town in North Rhine-Westphalia, Germany
 Tunnel Hopfenberg, on Bundesautobahn 44 in Hesse, Germany

Hills in Germany

 , in the Brückenau Kuppenrhön near Schwarzenfels (Sinntal), Main-Kinzig-Kreis, Hesse

 Hopfenberg (Waltershausen), near Winterstein (Waltershausen), county of Gotha, Thuringia
 A hill in the Göttingen Forest, South Lower Saxony, Germany

See also
 Hoffenberg
 Hoppenberg